The Los Padres Council was founded in 1917 as the Santa Barbara Council.  The SBC changed its name in 1929 to the Mission Council and stayed that way until 1994.

History
In 1994, the Santa Lucia Area Council  merged with the Mission Council to form the Los Padres Council. The Santa Lucia Area Council (#056) was founded in 1933, as the San Luis Obispo County Council. The Central Coast Counties council (#025), founded in 1922 merged into Santa Barbara in 1924.

Organization
Pacific Coast District
Cuesta District

Camps
 Rancho Alegre
Camp Rancho Alegre was severely damaged by the Whittier Fire in 2017 and as of 2020 is being rebuilt.

Order of the Arrow
 Chumash Lodge #90

See also

Scouting in California

References

Santa Barbara, California
Organizations based in Santa Barbara County, California
1917 establishments in California
Boy Scout councils in California